María Pilar Llop Cuenca (born 3 August 1973) is a Spanish judge and politician who has been serving as minister of Justice of Spain and ex officio First Notary of the Kingdom since 2021. Previously, she served as the 61st president of the Senate of Spain. She has been Spanish Senator designated by the Assembly of Madrid, an assembly of which she has been part since June 2019. Previously, she was member of the Assembly of Madrid from 2015 to 2018 and Government Delegate for Gender Violence of the Government of Spain from 2018 to 2019.

Early life and education 
Born on 3 August 1973 in Madrid to a humble family; her father was taxi-driver and her mother a hairdresser, she graduated in law at the Complutense University of Madrid. She also mastered judicial translation in the University of Alicante.

Career 
Llop entered the judicial career in 1999 and became a magistrate in 2004.

Llop ran in the Spanish Socialist Worker's Party (PSOE) list for the 2015 Madrilenian regional election led by Ángel Gabilondo and became a member of the 10th term of the regional legislature. She formalised the renouncement to her seat in the Assembly of Madrid on 13 July 2018, as she had been appointed by the Council of Ministers presided by Pedro Sánchez as the new Government Delegate for Gender Violence. She was sworn into office on 24 July 2018.

During her time in office, Llop led efforts on reforming Spain’s insolvency law to simplify bankruptcy proceedings and meet a major condition agreed with the European Commission to obtain European Union recovery funds.

References 

1973 births
21st-century Spanish women politicians
Complutense University of Madrid alumni
Living people
Members of the 10th Assembly of Madrid
Members of the 11th Assembly of Madrid
Members of the 13th Senate of Spain
Members of the 14th Senate of Spain
Presidents of the Senate of Spain
21st-century Spanish judges
Spanish Socialist Workers' Party politicians
University of Alicante alumni
Spanish women judges
Female justice ministers
Justice ministers of Spain
21st-century women judges